Paul Andries van der Bijl  or alternatively Van der Byl (23 May 1888 – 1939)  was a South African mycologist known for his work on polypores or bracket fungi.

Life and work 
Born on his father's farm in the Paarl district of Cape Colony, he graduated from the University of Stellenbosch (formerly Victoria College) in 1909.

In 1911 van der Bijl was appointed mycologist and phytopathologist at the South African National Collection of Fungi. In 1914 he was proposed as a member of the Linnean Society of London. In 1915 he headed the newly established phytopathological laboratory at the National Herbarium. He became the first professor of plant pathology in South Africa at the University of Stellenbosch in 1921. Stefanus Johannes Du Plessis (1908–1995) was a student of his.

Publications

References

1888 births
1939 deaths
Mycologists
20th-century South African botanists